The Association Montessori International/USA (AMI/USA) is a national non-profit organization that strives to propagate and further the teachings and work of Dr. Maria Montessori in the United States. As an affiliate of the Association Montessori Internationale, the Association Montessori International/USA oversees recognition of eligible Montessori schools, supports AMI Montessori teacher training centers, and organizes professional development opportunities in the United States. The organization also maintains a member database of about 17,000 teachers, school administrators, parents, and interested individuals.

History 

The Association Montessori Internationale is the oldest Montessori organization in the world. Maria Montessori established AMI in 1929, with the headquarters in Amsterdam, the Netherlands. The international head office of AMI is still located in Amsterdam. The organization was founded to maintain the integrity of her life's work and to ensure that it would be perpetuated after her death: "The AMI was to function not only as organizer of courses and overseer of teacher training, not only as a way of keeping the various worldwide Montessori schools and societies in touch with each other and disseminating information about the movement's ideas and activities, but also as a firm, controlling rights to the publication of Montessori's books and the manufacture and sale of the materials as well as recipient of training-course fees."

Mario Montessori, Maria’s son and personal assistant, was given the task of safeguarding the Montessori movement after Maria Montessori's death. "At [Montessori's] death she appointed Mr. Montessori as her successor in the task of directing and coordinating the work of the Association Montessori Internationale... A responsibility laid upon Mr. Montessori's shoulders was the delicate task of safeguarding the integrity of the Montessori movement, in the many countries where it is active, by recognizing under the aegis of the Association Montessori Internationale only such "Montessori" schools and training courses as faithfully interpret, both in spirit and practice, the Montessori principles."

Mario Montessori sent Margaret Elizabeth Stephenson to the United States in 1961. A trainee of Maria Montessori herself Stephenson first operated as Mario Montesori's personal representative in the United States. As the movement grew, Montessori granted her request to set up a branch office of AMI in the United States. AMI/USA was founded in 1972 and directed for its first ten years by Karin Salzmann. In 1988, Virginia McHugh succeeded Jon Osterkorn as Executive Director of AMI/USA.

Today there are over 200 AMI schools across the United States. The AMI recognition program was initiated in the United States to assist families in assessing whether schools are following Dr. Montessori’s principles and practices in their original integrity and completeness. The AMI standards maintain the level of excellence that Montessori envisioned and were developed by the AMI Scientific Pedagogy Group for this purpose. These standards ensure that children are provided the opportunity for full intellectual, social, and psychological growth and that the approach is consistent with what is presented in AMI training courses worldwide. It is upon these standards that AMI recognition status is granted by level within the school, each year. 

During the past twenty years the amount of scientific research confirming the Montessori method has increased: "Maria Montessori, through observation of children, developed materials that engage both the hands and the mind of the child. Science and research, especially in the past twenty years, have come to prove that Montessori's observations accurately describe the learning needs of children and have shown as well that the principles Dr. Montessori envisioned do create joyful learners."

Mission 
The Association Montessori International of the United States (AMI/USA) is dedicated to bringing the principles of Dr. Maria Montessori to the education of children through its support and advancement of the AMI Montessori community in the United States. AMI/USA collaborates with affiliates such as the Elementary Alumni Association (EAA) and the North American Montessori Teachers' Association (NAMTA).

Programs 

School Recognition Program
A certificate of recognition is granted to a subset of Montessori schools who prove that they meet a set of specific Montessori standards as derived from Maria Montessori’s original research and methodology. Programs must apply annually for one of the following levels: recognized, affiliated, or associated.

Professional Development
AMI/USA facilitates conferences each year. The annual refresher course and workshops cater to all AMI trained professionals, as well as classroom assistants, administrators, and, beginning in 2009, parents. Additionally, in fall and spring, AMI/USA sponsors a regional conferences.

Membership
AMI/USA facilitates membership benefits to AMI members living in the United States. Membership to AMI through AMI/USA is offered on an individual basis; schools and institutions are not eligible for AMI membership. Membership benefits include a yearly subscription to AMI and AMI/USA publications, including the quarterly AMI/USA newsletter AMI/USA News and the bi-annual AMI scholarly journal Communications. Members also receive a preferred rate on AMI/USA publications, and receive a discount from AMI approved Montessori materials distributors.

Teacher Training Program
AMI/USA works in partnership with AMI Montessori training centers to help ensure the caliber of AMI teacher training is maintained in the United States. "The standards of Montessori practice were originally delineated by the Association Montessori International (AMI) in 1929. They represent an integrated body of materials, methodology, psychology, and philosophy that provides Montessori teachers with a common reference point."

We Are Montessori
AMI/USA also coordinates the "We Are Montessori" project, which has the objective of "celebrating Montessori alumni and bringing awareness to the benefits of Montessori education." The initiative collects information to showcase alumni they consider as successful, and the schools that fostered their education. To date, AMI/USA it is the only organization systematically collecting information on Montessori alumni in the United States.

See also
Montessori in the United States

References

AMI Teacher Training Centers in the United States 

Hershey Montessori Institute at Lake Erie College
The Montessori Institute
The Montessori Institute Northwest
Montessori Institute of Atlanta
The Montessori Institute of Milwaukee
The Montessori Institute of Milwaukee- Kansas City (Satellite)
The Montessori Institute of North Texas
Montessori Institute of San Diego
Montessori Institute of San Diego- Miami (Satellite)
Montessori Teacher Training Center of Northern California
Montessori Training Center of Minnesota
Montessori Training Center of New England
Montessori Training Center of St. Louis
Washington Montessori Institute at Loyola University Maryland

Educational organizations based in the United States
Montessori education
1972 establishments in the United States